Pedro David Daleccio Torres (born October 7, 1990), known professionally as Dalex, is an American urbano singer. He was formerly part of the duo Jayma y Dalex.

Currently, Dalex is signed to the Rich Music record label.

Jayma y Dalex 
After signing with Anakin Entertainment, Dalex started singing in the duo Jayma and Dalex. Their first single "Aquellos Tiempos" drew attention. Subsequently, the duo collaborated with urban artist Cosculluela on the song "Lento," which surpassed a million views on YouTube.

Jayma and Dalex's first album, "Gravedad", was released in October 2015.  It featured collaborations with Justin Quiles, Jory Boy and Pusho.

Solo career - EPs, Climaxxx, and Unisex 
In 2017, Jayma y Dalex split and Dalex began his solo career and was signed by Rich Music. His first debut single, "Puesto Pal Millón" was released in 2018, with Sech, Myke Towers, Justin Quiles, Arcángel, and Alex Rose joining him on the remix after the single gained popularity . This led to Dalex releasing two EPs in 2018: "License to Trap" and "La Nueva Ola" with features like Rauw Alejandro, Sech, Lyanno, and Justin Quiles.  

In 2018 he released the single "Pa Mi" with  Rafa Pabön, which peaked inside the top three on the streaming charts in six countries and at number one in 12 other countries. This led to the release of "Pa Mi (Remix)" which featured Cazzu, Sech, Feid, Khea, and Lenny Tavárez and became Dalex's first Billboard charting song.  

He released his first studio album "Climaxxx" in 2019 which features Nicky Jam, Justin Quiles, Rauw Alejandro, and Lyanno. "Climaxxx" debuted at number 20 on the Global Streaming list and in the Top 20 Latin Rhythms Albums rankings. In June, he released "Cuaderno," a popular video and song that also featured Nicky Jam, Sech, Justin Quiles, Feid, Lenny Tavárez, and Rafa Pabon. In the same year, he collaborated on the EP “The Academy” with fellow Rich Music labelmates Sech, Justin Quiles, along with promising artists Feid, Lenny Tavárez, and Dímelo Flow. He released the Modo Avión mixtape in 2020.

"Unisex", Dalex's second LP, was released in 2021. The album featured the songs "Máquina del Tiempo" with Rauw Alejandro, and "XLEY," with one of his favorite artists, Trey Songz. The album also features Jay Wheeler, Zion y Lennox, and Ryan Castro.

Discography

Albums

Collaborative Albums

EPs

Singles

As lead artist

As a featured artist

References 

1990 births
Living people
Musicians from Orlando, Florida
Musicians from Philadelphia
American musicians of Puerto Rican descent